Stanowice  is a village in the administrative district of Gmina Strzegom, within Świdnica County, Lower Silesian Voivodeship, in south-western Poland. Prior to 1945 it was in Germany.

The village has an approximate population of 1,200.

Notable residents
 Carl Wagener (1901–1988), Wehrmacht general

References

Villages in Świdnica County